Seraticin is an antibiotic discovered by scientists at Swansea University able to inhibit 12 different strains of methicillin-resistant Staphylococcus aureus (MRSA), as well as E. coli and C. difficile. The research was funded by the charity Action Medical Research, with support from the Rosetrees Trust. Seraticin was isolated as a compound of less than 500 Da molecular weight from the maggot secretions of the common green bottle fly (Lucilia sericata). It was patented in 2010 and has the empirical formula , but its chemical identity is unknown.

References

Antibiotics
Drugs with undisclosed chemical structures